Nangal Dam - Amb Andaura Passenger is a Passenger express train of the Indian Railways connecting Amb Andaura in Himachal Pradesh and  Nangal Dam in Punjab. It is currently being operated with 64514/64515 train numbers on daily basis.

Route and halts

Average speed and frequency
The train runs with an average speed of 37 km/h and completes 44 km in 1 hrs 15 mins.

See also 

 Nangal Dam railway station
 Amb Andaura railway station
 Himachal Express
 Amb Andaura - Ambala DMU

External links 
 54581/Nangal Dam - Amb Andaura Passenger 
 54581/Nangal Dam - Amb Andaura Passenger

References

Rail transport in Himachal Pradesh
Rail transport in Punjab, India
Slow and fast passenger trains in India